These were the team rosters of the nations participating in the men's ice hockey tournament of the 2014 Winter Olympics. Each team was permitted a roster of 22 skaters and 3 goaltenders.

Group A

Russia
The following is the Russian roster in the men's ice hockey tournament of the 2014 Winter Olympics.

Head coach:  Zinetula Bilyaletdinov     Assistant coach:  Valery Belov

Slovakia
The following is the Slovak roster in the men's ice hockey tournament of the 2014 Winter Olympics.

Forward Marian Gaborik was also selected but was unable to play due to injury.

Slovenia
The following is the Slovenian roster in the men's ice hockey tournament of the 2014 Winter Olympics.

United States
The following is the American roster in the men's ice hockey tournament of the 2014 Winter Olympics.

Group B

Austria

The following is the Austrian roster in the men's ice hockey tournament of the 2014 Winter Olympics.

Canada
The following is the Canadian roster for the men's ice hockey tournament at the 2014 Winter Olympics.

Forward Steven Stamkos was also selected but was unable to participate due to injury. He was replaced by Martin St. Louis.

Finland
The Finnish roster for the men's ice hockey tournament of the 2014 Winter Olympics was published on 7 January 2014. The players were picked by the head coach Erkka Westerlund.

Forwards Mikko Koivu and Valtteri Filppula were also selected but were unable to participate due to injury. They were replaced by Jarkko Immonen and Sakari Salminen respectively.

Norway
The following is the Norwegian roster in the men's ice hockey tournament of the 2014 Winter Olympics.

Group C

Czech Republic
The following is the Czech roster in the men's ice hockey tournament of the 2014 Winter Olympics.

Forward Vladimír Sobotka was also selected but was unable to participate due to injury. He was replaced by Martin Erat.

Latvia
The following is the Latvian roster in the men's ice hockey tournament of the 2014 Winter Olympics.

Switzerland
The following is the Swiss roster in the men's ice hockey tournament of the 2014 Winter Olympics.

Sweden
The following is the Swedish roster in the men's ice hockey tournament of the 2014 Winter Olympics.

Forwards Johan Franzén and Henrik Sedin were also selected but were unable to participate due to injury. They were replaced by Gustav Nyquist and Marcus Johansson respectively.  Henrik Zetterberg was originally named team captain but was replaced by Niklas Kronwall when Zetterberg left the Games due to injury.

See also
Ice hockey at the 2014 Winter Olympics – Women's team rosters

References

rosters

2014